The 1999 Ms. Olympia contest was an IFBB professional bodybuilding competition held October 2, 1999, in Secaucus, New Jersey, alongside the 1999 Women's Pro Extravaganza. It was the 20th Ms. Olympia competition held.

Prizes
 1st $25,000
 2nd $10,000
 3rd $7,000
 4th $4,000
 5th $3,000
 6th $1,000
Total: $50,000

Competitors weight
 Lesa Lewis - 
 Yaxeni Oriquen-Garcia - 
 Brenda Raganot - 
 Tazzie Colomb - 
 Kim Chizevsky-Nicholls - 
 Iris Kyle - 
 Laura Binetti- 
 Vickie Gates - 
 Valentina Chepiga - 
 Laura Creavalle - 
 Andrulla Blanchette - 
 Gayle Moher -

Pre-judging

Symmetry round
In this round the judges are looking for the overall muscle balance; that the proportion of muscle is distributed evenly over the bodybuilder's frame.

 Brenda Ragonot, Laura Binetti, Andrulla Blanchette, Vickie Gates, Laura Creavalle, Tazzie Colomb, Valentina Chepiga, Gayle Moher, Yaxeni Oriquen, Lesa Lewis, Iris Kyle, Kim Chizevsky
 Kim Chizevsky, Iris Kyle, Lesa Lewis, Yaxeni Oriquen, Gayle Moher, Valentina Chepiga, Tazzie Colomb, Laura Creavalle, Vickie Gates, Andrlla Blanchette, Laura Binetti, and Brenda Ragonot

Results
 1st - Kim Chizevsky-Nicholls
 2nd - Vickie Gates
 3rd - Laura Creavalle
 4th - Iris Kyle
 5th - Lesa Lewis
 6th - Tazzie Colomb
 7th - Andrulla Blanchette
 8th - Laura Binetti
 9th - Brenda Raganot
 10th - Yaxeni Oriquen-Garcia
 11th - Gayle Moher
 12th - Valentina Chepiga

Scorecard

Attended
12th Ms. Olympia attended - Laura Creavalle
6th Ms. Olympia attended - Kim Chizevsky-Nicholls
5th Ms. Olympia attended - Laura Binetti
4th Ms. Olympia attended - Vickie Gates
3rd Ms. Olympia attended - Lesa Lewis, Gayle Moher, and Andrulla Blanchette
2nd Ms. Olympia attended - Tazzie Colomb, Valentina Chepiga, and Yaxeni Oriquen-Garcia
1st Ms. Olympia attended - Iris Kyle and Brenda Raganot
Previous year Olympia attendees who did not attend - Dayana Cadeau, Yolanda Hughes, Chris Bongiovanni, Zdenka Turda, Jacqueline De Gennaro, Jitka Harazimova, Beate Drabing, and Sipka Berska

Notable Events
This was Kim Chizevsky's 4th overall and consecutive Olympia win. This was also Kim's last Olympia before she retired from bodybuilding.
This was Iris Kyle's first Olympia she attended.

1999 Ms. Olympia controversy 
The 1999 Ms. Olympia was originally scheduled to be held on 9 October in Santa Monica, California. However, one month before the scheduled date, the IFBB announced that the contest had been cancelled. The main cause was the withdrawal of promoter Jarka Kastnerova (who promoted the 1998 contest in Prague) for financial reasons, including a low number of advance ticket sales for the 1999 event. The backlash following the announcement led to a flurry of activity, with the contest being rescheduled as part of the Women's Extravaganza (promoted by Kenny Kassel and Bob Bonham) in Secaucus, New Jersey, on 2 October. Last minute sponsorship came from several sources, most significantly in the form of $50,000 from Flex magazine.

See also
 Women's Pro Extravaganza
 1999 Mr. Olympia

References

 1999 Ms. Olympia held in Secaucus, New Jersey on October 2nd
 1999 Ms Olympia Results

External links
 Competitor History of the Ms. Olympia

Ms Olympia, 1999
1999 in bodybuilding
Ms. Olympia
Ms. Olympia
History of female bodybuilding